Lubei Subdistrict is a subdistrict of Taocheng District, Hengshui, Hebei, People's Republic of China, covering part of the northern portion of Hengshui's urban core , it has 10 residential communities under its administration.

See also 
 List of township-level divisions of Hebei

References 

Township-level divisions of Hebei